Tang Miao (Chinese: 唐淼; pinyin: Táng Miǎo;  ; born 8 November 1990 in Anhui) is a Chinese footballer who plays for Zibo Cuju, on loan from Chengdu Rongcheng.

Club career
Tang Miao was signed into the first team from the academy by Jiangsu Sainty and made his debut off the bench against Beijing Guoan on 3 April 2011, coming on at 46 minutes for Zhou Yun in a 2-0 defeat. Tang would be loaned out the third tier club Shenzhen Fengpeng to gain more playing time in the 2013 league campaign. This would be followed by another loan to Nanjing Qianbao the next season.  

In 2014, Tang transferred to China League Two side Nanjing Qianbao. On 8 January 2016 the club relocated to the city of Chengdu and he would move with them as they renamed themselves Chengdu Qbao. Chengdu Qbao withdrew from League Two in 2018 when the Qbao Group was under investigation with illegal fund raising. On 20 March 2018, a phoenix club was formed by Chengdu Better City Investment Group Co., Ltd. and Tang would join them as they participated in the 2018 Chinese Champions League. He would go on to win promotion with the club as they came runners-up at the end of the 2019 China League Two season. He would be a regular within the team as he aided them to a meteoric rise through the divisions as the club gained promotion to the top tier at the end of the 2021 league campaign.

Career statistics 

Statistics accurate as of match played 8 January 2023.

References

External links
Player profile at Soccerway.com

Living people
1990 births
Chinese footballers
Footballers from Anhui
Jiangsu F.C. players
Chengdu Better City F.C. players
Chinese Super League players
China League Two players
China League One players
Association football midfielders